Bruce Ronald "Tony" George (25 September 1919 – 21 July 2006) was a New Zealand weightlifter, who won medals for his country at two British Empire Games. 

He won the silver medal at the 1950 British Empire Games in the men's middleweight (–75 kg) division. At the 1954 British Empire Games he won the bronze medal in the men's light heavyweight (–82.5 kg) event. George also won 13 national weightlifting championship titles: in the middleweight division in consecutive years from 1947 to 1950; the light heavyweight division every year from 1951 to 1958; and the middle heavyweight division in 1963.

George was the manager of the New Zealand weightlifting team at the 1966 British Empire and Commonwealth Games in Kingston.

References

1919 births
2006 deaths
New Zealand male weightlifters
Commonwealth Games silver medallists for New Zealand
Commonwealth Games bronze medallists for New Zealand
Weightlifters at the 1950 British Empire Games
Weightlifters at the 1954 British Empire and Commonwealth Games
Commonwealth Games medallists in weightlifting
20th-century New Zealand people
Medallists at the 1950 British Empire Games
Medallists at the 1954 British Empire and Commonwealth Games